Vitaliy Vasylyovych Fedoriv (born 23 January 1977) is a Ukrainian civil servant and politician. He is a former Governor of Ivano-Frankivsk Oblast, in office from April 2020 until November 2020.

Biography 
He studied at the Ivano-Frankivsk National Technical University of Oil and Gas.

Fedoriv served as Deputy Head of the State Financial Inspection in Ivano-Frankivsk Oblast.

In 2015, he ran for the Ivano-Frankivsk Oblast Council.

Since November 2018, he was Deputy Governor of Ivano-Frankivsk Oblast. Fedoriv was appointed Governor of Ivano-Frankivsk Oblast on 24 April 2020. He had been acting Governor from 10 February to 24 April 2020. Fedoriv was dismissed by President Volodymyr Zelensky on 5 November 2020.

Income 
For 2019, he declared a salary of UAH 525,142 and a 2008 Daewoo Lanos car.

References

External links 
 
 
 

1977 births
Living people
People from Ivano-Frankivsk Oblast
Ukrainian civil servants
Governors of Ivano-Frankivsk Oblast
Liberty (political party) politicians
21st-century Ukrainian politicians